Benton Airport may refer to:

Benton Municipal Airport in Benton, Illinois, United States (FAA: H96)
Benton Airpark (disambiguation):
Benton Field (Benton Airpark) in Redding, California, United States (FAA: O85)
Lloyd Stearman Field (Benton Airpark) in Benton, Kansas, United States (FAA: 1K1)